Inspire Enterprise Academy (formerly Southampton Studio School) was a Studio school located in Southampton, designed for students aged 14–19 who intended to pursue a career in business and enterprise. It was founded in 2013 as part of the Studio Schools Trust. The school combined project-based learning and business experiences, with academic achievement, aimed at equipping students with a diverse range of skills. In September 2014 Inspire Enterprise Academy's sister, the Isle of Wight Studio School, opened on the Isle of Wight.

On 6 July 2015 the school announced that it would close at the end of the academic year. The school formally closed in August 2015. Children in Year 10 were offered a transfer to the Isle of Wight Studio School.

References

Defunct schools in Southampton
Defunct studio schools
Educational institutions established in 2013
2013 establishments in England
Educational institutions disestablished in 2015
2015 disestablishments in England